Education Maximum School of Engineering and Applied Research is an institute of higher education in Ambala, Haryana, India. It was established in 2009 by the Asa Ram Aggarwal Society of Education and Research and is affiliated to Kurushetra University, Kurukshetra for all academic purposes.

Location
The college is situated on Kalpi-Naraingarh road near village Baduali in Ambala district about 60 km from Chandigarh and 6 km from the Ambala-Jagadhri highway. The campus is surrounded mostly agriculture land with little human population.

Campus
The campus of the college is spread over 70 acres of land. Separate facilities of hostel are provided for male and female candidates.

Courses
The college provides bachelor of technology courses in the following trades:-
Civil engineering
Mechanical engineering
Electronics and Communication engineering
Automobile engineering
Computer science and engineering

Affiliations
The college is affiliated to Kurukshetra University, for all academic purposes. The college is also approved by All India Council for Technical Education which is statutory body and a national-level council for technical education, under Department of Higher Education, Ministry of Human Resource Development.

AICTE approval
"All India Council for Technical Education" has approved below mentioned number of seats in ESEAR for the session 2014–2015.

Selection
The seats in the college are filled on + 2 marks percentage and also on management quota. Moreover, the university has provided norms that students having +2 percentage at least 40 can only apply for bachelor of technology course. The college is noted for providing quality education in Civil engineering in the district and is the only college that provides the Bachelor of Technology in Automobile engineering in Ambala district.

See also
 Kalpi
 List of engineering colleges affiliated to Kurukshetra University, Kurukshetra
 List of colleges affiliated to Kurukshetra University, Kurukshetra
 Jind Institute of Engineering and Technology

References

Engineering colleges in Haryana
Ambala
Educational institutions established in 2009
2009 establishments in Haryana